California Proposition 20 may refer to:

1922 California Proposition 20 - Approved Osteopathic Initiatives Act
1972 California Proposition 20 - Established the California Coastal Commission
2010 California Proposition 20 - Approved Congressional Redistricting Initiative
2020 California Proposition 20 - Rejected initiative regarding non-violent felonies